Kot Adu Junction railway station is  located in Kot Addu, Punjab, Pakistan.

See also
 List of railway stations in Pakistan
 Pakistan Railways

References

External links

Kot Addu District
Railway stations on Sher Shah–Kot Addu Branch Line
Railway stations on Kotri–Attock Railway Line (ML 2)